The powerlifting competition at the 2017 World Games took place from July 24 to July 26, in Wrocław in Poland, at the National Forum of Music.

Participating nations

Medal table

Men

Women

References

External links
 The World Games 2017
 Result Book

2017 World Games